Ballard Pier Mole was a station  of the Mumbai Port Trust Railway in the Ballard Pier precinct of South Mumbai, India. The station was the terminating station of the Frontier Mail, now the Golden Temple Mail.

References
Irfca.org
Mumbai Mirror, 25 Oct 2005, Manoj R Nair

Defunct railway stations in Mumbai